In civil engineering, machine control is used to accurately position earthwork machinery based on 3D design models and GPS systems, and thus aid machine operators to e.g. control the position of a road grader's blade. Many machine control systems utilize the Real Time Kinematic (RTK) system to improve the positioning accuracy.

There are four dominant manufacturers of machine control systems: MOBA Mobile Automation AG, Trimble Navigation Limited, Topcon Positioning Systems and Leica Geosystems. In 2010, The Kellogg Report was published to serve as a resource for comparing the systems from these and other manufacturers.

See also
 GPS in the Earthmoving Industry

References

Civil engineering
Civil engineering articles needing expert attention